Misumenoides is a genus of spiders in the family Thomisidae. Spiders in this family are commonly called "crab" or "flower" spiders.

Species
, the World Spider Catalog listed the following 35 species:
 Misumenoides annulipes  – Mexico, Guatemala
 Misumenoides athleticus  – Mexico, Brazil
 Misumenoides bifissus  – Guatemala
 Misumenoides blandus  – Guatemala, Panama
 Misumenoides carminatus  – Argentina
 Misumenoides chlorophilus  – Argentina
 Misumenoides corticatus  – Brazil
 Misumenoides crassipes  – Colombia
 Misumenoides dasysternon  – Chile
 Misumenoides decipiens  – Venezuela
 Misumenoides depressus  – Guatemala
 Misumenoides eximius  – Argentina
 Misumenoides formosipes  – Canada, United States
 Misumenoides fusciventris  – Brazil
 Misumenoides gerschmanae  – Argentina
 Misumenoides illotus  – Brazil
 Misumenoides magnus  – Mexico to Colombia
 Misumenoides nicoleti  – Chile
 Misumenoides nigripes  – Brazil
 Misumenoides nigromaculatus  – Brazil
 Misumenoides obesulus  – Mexico
 Misumenoides parvus  – Mexico to Colombia
 Misumenoides paucispinosus  – Brazil, Guyana
 Misumenoides proseni  – Argentina
 Misumenoides quetzaltocatl  – Mexico
 Misumenoides roseiceps  – Brazil
 Misumenoides rubrithorax  – Guyana
 Misumenoides rubroniger  – Brazil
 Misumenoides rugosus  – Guatemala, Panama
 Misumenoides similis  – Brazil
 Misumenoides tibialis  – Panama, Brazil
 Misumenoides variegatus  – Argentina
 Misumenoides vigilans  – Guatemala
 Misumenoides vulneratus  – Brazil

The female Misumenoides formosipes, while similar to Misumena vatia, is not as large, and can be distinguished by the inverted 'V' marking on its back (with the point of the V closer to the cephalothorax) and the 'mask' over its eyes.  In most respects this spider behaves like the goldenrod spider, also commonly hunting in goldenrod sprays in the fall.  It tends to take smaller prey, however, avoiding the bumblebees and large butterflies in favor of honeybees, large flies and small butterflies such as skippers.  Male M. formosipes are quite distinctive, being much smaller than females and having a greenish cephalothorax, yellow-orange abdomen, and long, red to reddish-black front legs.  They are found on a wide variety of plants as they wander in search of females in late summer and early fall.

References

External links
 Crab spider Misumenoides formocipes diagnostic photos
 Picture of M. formosipes

Thomisidae
Araneomorphae genera
Spiders of South America
Spiders of North America